Orconectes barri, the Cumberland Plateau cave crayfish, is a species of crayfish in the family Cambaridae. It is native to Kentucky and Tennessee in the United States, where it is found in nine caves on the Cumberland Plateau.

References

Cambaridae
Fauna of the United States
Freshwater crustaceans of North America
Crustaceans described in 2008
Cave crayfish